Admiral Júlio Soares de Moura Neto, is a Brazilian Navy admiral. He was the commander of the Brazilian Navy from 2007 to 2015.

He joined the Brazilian Navy in 1959.

Honours and awards
His decorations include Defense Merit Order, Naval Merit Order, Military Merit Order, Air Force Merit Order, Rio Branco Order, Military Justice Merit Order, Military Gold Medal (platinum ribbon for 40 years of service), Tamandaré Merit Medal, Sea Service Merit Medal (four silver anchors for 1580 days in operations at sea), Medal of the “Pacificador”, Santos Dumont Merit Medal, Paraguayan National Navy Medal, and
Argentinean Navy Medal

References

External links

 Navy Commander's Office 

Brazilian admirals
Living people
1943 births
Recipients of the Order of Naval Merit (Brazil)